The list of Canadian school districts has been split by province and territory:

List of school authorities in Alberta
List of school districts in British Columbia
List of school districts in Manitoba
List of school districts in New Brunswick
List of school districts in Newfoundland and Labrador
List of school districts in Nova Scotia
List of school districts in Ontario
List of school districts in Prince Edward Island
List of school districts in Quebec
List of school divisions in Saskatchewan
List of school districts in the Northwest Territories
List of school districts in Nunavut
List of school districts in Yukon

See also
Education in Canada
Lists of schools in Canada

School districts in Canada